North Louisiana, also known locally as Sportsman's Paradise, (a name sometimes attributed to the state as a whole) is a region in the U.S. state of Louisiana. The region has two metropolitan areas: Shreveport-Bossier City and Monroe-West Monroe; the Shreveport area is the largest metropolitan area by population in North Louisiana.

Geography
The northwestern portion of Louisiana is culturally and economically attached to Northeast Texas and Southwest Arkansas. Combined they comprise the Ark-La-Tex area, just as the northeastern portion of Louisiana, Southeast Arkansas, and Northwest Mississippi are known as the Ark-La-Miss. The Louisiana Central Hill Country, the hilly areas of LaSalle, Grant, Winn, Caldwell, Natchitoches, Jackson, Lincoln, and Bienville parishes, extend into portions of North Louisiana's border with Central Louisiana.

Metropolitan and micropolitan areas 
There are two combined statistical areas, two metropolitan statistical areas, and two micropolitan statistical areas that include North Louisiana parishes.

Shreveport-Bossier City metropolitan area
Monroe-West Monroe metropolitan statistical area
Ruston micropolitan statistical area
Bastrop micropolitan statistical area
Monroe-Ruston-Bastrop combined statistical area
Shreveport-Bossier City-Minden combined statistical area

Parishes
North Louisiana consists of the following 20 parishes:

Bienville
Bossier
Caddo
Caldwell
Claiborne
DeSoto
East Carroll
Franklin
Jackson
Lincoln
Madison
Morehouse
Ouachita
Red River
Richland
Tensas
Union
Webster
West Carroll
Winn

See also
Intrastate regions
Driskill Mountain
North Louisiana Historical Association

References

<--Broken link, May 2017.

External links
Map of Louisiana regions
Clickable Louisiana Map

 
Regions of Louisiana